Pavel Soukup (born 2 January 1971 in Stod) is a retired Czech middle-distance runner who specialised in the 800 metres. He is best known for winning bronze medals at the 1995 World Indoor Championships and the 1995 Summer Universiade. In addition, he competed at the 1996 Summer Olympics, as well as two World Championships.

His personal bests in the event are 1:45.37 outdoors (Nürnberg 1997) and 1:46.38 indoors (Ludwigshafen 1995).

Competition record

References

1971 births
Living people
Czech male middle-distance runners
Czechoslovak male middle-distance runners
World Athletics Championships athletes for the Czech Republic
Athletes (track and field) at the 1996 Summer Olympics
Olympic athletes of the Czech Republic
People from Stod
Competitors at the 1991 Summer Universiade
Universiade medalists in athletics (track and field)
Universiade bronze medalists for the Czech Republic
Medalists at the 1995 Summer Universiade
Sportspeople from the Plzeň Region